This is the list of destinations that Malév Hungarian Airlines used to serve before it ceased operations on 3 February 2012.

Destinations

Africa

North Africa
 
 Tripoli – Tripoli International Airport

Asia

Middle East
 
 Tel Aviv – Ben Gurion Airport
 
 Amman – Queen Alia International Airport
 
 Beirut – Beirut–Rafic Hariri International Airport
 
 Damascus – Damascus International Airport

Europe

Central Europe
 
 Zürich – Zürich Airport

Eastern Europe
 
 Burgas – Burgas Airport Seasonal
 Sofia – Sofia Airport
 Varna – Varna Airport
 
 Prague – Václav Havel Airport Prague
 
 Warsaw – Warsaw Chopin Airport
 
 Budapest – Budapest Ferenc Liszt International Airport Hub
 
 Moscow – Sheremetyevo International Airport
 Saint Petersburg – Pulkovo Airport
 
 Bucharest – Henri Coandă International Airport
 Cluj-Napoca – Cluj International Airport
 Târgu Mureș – Târgu Mureș International Airport
 
 Kyiv – Boryspil International Airport
 Odessa – Odesa International Airport

Northern Europe
 
 Copenhagen – Copenhagen Airport
 
 Helsinki – Helsinki Airport
 
 Gothenburg – Göteborg Landvetter Airport
 Stockholm – Stockholm Arlanda Airport

Southern Europe
 
 Tirana – Tirana International Airport Nënë Tereza
 
 Sarajevo – Sarajevo International Airport
 
 Split – Split Airport Seasonal
 Zagreb – Zagreb Airport
 
 Larnaca – Larnaca International Airport
 
 Athens – Athens International Airport
 Heraklion – Heraklion International Airport Seasonal
 Thessaloniki – Thessaloniki International Airport
 
 Milan – Milan Malpensa Airport
 Rome – Leonardo da Vinci–Fiumicino Airport
 
 Pristina – Pristina International Airport Adem Jashari
 
 Skopje – Skopje International Airport
 
 Podgorica – Podgorica Airport
 
 Barcelona – Barcelona–El Prat Airport
 Madrid – Adolfo Suárez Madrid–Barajas Airport
 Málaga – Málaga Airport Seasonal
 
 Belgrade – Belgrade Nikola Tesla Airport
 
 Istanbul – Istanbul Atatürk Airport

Western Europe
 
 Brussels – Brussels Airport
 
 Dublin – Dublin Airport
 
 Paris – Charles de Gaulle Airport
 
 Amsterdam – Amsterdam Airport Schiphol
 
 Berlin – Berlin Tegel Airport
 Frankfurt – Frankfurt Airport
 Hamburg – Hamburg Airport
 Stuttgart – Stuttgart Airport
 
 London – Gatwick Airport

Terminated destinations before closure

Africa

North Africa
 
 Cairo – Cairo International Airport

Asia

Far East
 
 Beijing – Beijing Capital International Airport

Southeast Asia
 
 Bangkok – Don Mueang International Airport

Southwest Asia
 
 Baghdad – Baghdad International Airport
 
 Karachi – Jinnah International Airport
 
 Doha – Hamad International Airport
 
 Abu Dhabi – Abu Dhabi International Airport
 Dubai – Dubai International Airport

Europe

Central Europe
 
 Vienna – Vienna International Airport
 
 Geneva – Geneva Airport

Eastern Europe
 
 Burgas – Burgas Airport
 
 Békéscsaba – Békés Airport
 Debrecen – Debrecen International Airport
 Győr – Győr-Pér International Airport
 Kaposvár – Kaposvár Airport
 Miskolc – Miskolc Airport
 Nagykanizsa – Nagykanizsa Airport
 Pécs – Pécs-Pogány International Airport
 Sármellék – Hévíz-Balaton Airport
 Siófok – Siófok-Kiliti Airport
 Szeged – Szeged Airport
 Szombathely – Szombathely Airport
 Zalaegerszeg – Zalaegerszeg-Andráshida Airport
 
 Vilnius – Vilnius Airport
 
 Warsaw – Warsaw Chopin Airport
 
 Constanța – Mihail Kogălniceanu International Airport
 Iaşi – Iaşi International Airport
 Timișoara – Timișoara Traian Vuia International Airport
 
 Moscow – Moscow Sheremetyevo
 Saint Petersburg – Pulkovo Airport
 
 Bratislava – Bratislava Airport

Northern Europe
 
 Oslo – Oslo Gardermoen Airport

Southern Europe
 
 Dubrovnik – Dubrovnik Airport
 
 Nicosia – Nicosia International Airport
 
 Bologna – Bologna Guglielmo Marconi Airport
 Milan – Linate Airport
 Trieste – Trieste – Friuli Venezia Giulia Airport
 Venice – Venice Marco Polo Airport
 
 Ljubljana – Ljubljana Jože Pučnik Airport

Western Europe
 
 Lyon – Lyon–Saint-Exupéry Airport
 Paris – Orly Airport
 
 Cork – Cork Airport
 
 Luxembourg City – Luxembourg Findel Airport
 
 Manchester – Manchester Airport
 London – Heathrow Airport
 London – Stansted Airport
 
 Berlin – Berlin Schönefeld Airport
 Cologne – Cologne Bonn Airport
 Dresden – Dresden Airpor
 Düsseldorf – Düsseldorf Airport
 Erfurt – Erfurt–Weimar Airport
 Leipzig – Leipzig/Halle Airport
 Munich – Munich Airport

Americas

North America
 
 Toronto – Toronto Pearson International Airport
 
 New York City – John F. Kennedy International Airport

References

http://www.fn.hu/utazas/20090909/kevesebb_celallomasra_repul_malev/

Lists of airline destinations